The ROH  Baltimore Dojo, formerly known as the ROH Wrestling Academy, is a professional wrestling school operated by the American professional wrestling promotion Ring of Honor in Baltimore, Maryland. 

Trainees from the school are referred to as the "Future of Honor".

History
Originally named the ROH Wrestling Academy, the current name was adopted in August 2016, when the school reopened after a hiatus. Delirious operates as the head trainer of the school with Cheeseburger and Will Ferrara as his assistants. previous head trainers of the academy include former ROH World Champions CM Punk, Austin Aries, and Bryan Danielson. From 2005 to 2008, ROH used a "Top of the Class" trophy to promote the students on the main show; while wrestlers won and lost the trophy in matches, the school's head trainer chose the winners.

ROH Top of the Class Trophy Championship 

The ROH Top of the Class Trophy Championship was a championship that was competed for and won by ROH rookies and dojo trainees.

See also

NJPW Dojo

References

External links

Professional wrestling schools
Ring of Honor
2009 establishments in Illinois
Dōjō